Ultimat is a brand of vodka produced in Poland and sold through the Patrón Spirits Company. 

It is made from a blend of three different sources, potato, wheat and rye. It is triple distilled in Poland.

History
The Patron Spirits Company, worldwide exclusive importer and marketer of the Patron tequila brand, acquired the global distribution rights to Ultimat vodka from New York-based Adamba Imports International.

References

Polish vodkas